Bradley King may refer to:
Bradley King (screenwriter) (1894–1977), pen name of Josephine McLaughlin, American screenwriter
Bradley King (filmmaker), American film director and screenwriter, fl. 2004–present
Bradley King (lighting designer), American theatrical lighting designer
William Bradley-King (born 1997), American football player

See also
Brad King (disambiguation)